The 2016 Allsvenskan, part of the 2016 Swedish football season, is the 92nd season of Allsvenskan since its establishment in 1924. The fixtures were released on 9 December 2015 and it included a meeting between the two most recent champions IFK Norrköping and Malmö FF (in Malmö) as the opening match, a replay of the last round of the previous season. The season started on 2 April 2016 and ended in November 2016.

IFK Norrköping were the defending champions after winning the title in the last round in the previous season. Malmö FF won the Swedish championship this season, their 22nd Allsvenskan title and 19th Swedish championship overall, in the 28th round on 26 October 2016 when they won 3–0 in the away fixture against Falkenbergs FF at Falkenbergs IP.

A total of 16 teams are contesting the league.

Summary

Allsvenskans stora pris
For the fourth year running, the broadcaster of Allsvenskan, C More Entertainment, hosted an award ceremony where they presented seven awards and two special awards to the players and staff of the 16 Allsvenskan clubs, the award ceremony was held on 17 November 2016. The nominations for the 2016 season were officially announced on 11 November 2016. Nominees are displayed below, the winners are marked in bold text. Malmö FF received the most nominations with seven nominations while IFK Norrköping received four nominations, and AIK and IF Elfsborg received two nominations. Djurgårdens IF, Falkenbergs FF and IFK Göteborg received one nomination each.

Goalkeeper of the year
Johan Wiland (Malmö FF)
Patrik Carlgren (AIK)
Kevin Stuhr Ellegaard (IF Elfsborg)

Defender of the year
Andreas Johansson (IFK Norrköping)
Emil Salomonsson (IFK Göteborg)
Kári Árnason (Malmö FF)

Midfielder of the year
Magnus Wolff Eikrem (Malmö FF)
Anders Christiansen (Malmö FF)
Viktor Claesson (IF Elfsborg)

Forward of the year
Viðar Örn Kjartansson (Malmö FF)
Christoffer Nyman (IFK Norrköping)
Sebastian Andersson (IFK Norrköping)

Newcomer of the year
Alexander Isak (AIK)
Jesper Karlsson (Falkenbergs FF)
Michael Olunga (Djurgårdens IF)

Manager of the year
Graham Potter (Östersunds FK)
Rikard Norling (AIK)
Allan Kuhn (Malmö FF)

Most valuable player of the year
Andreas Johansson (IFK Norrköping)
Magnus Wolff Eikrem (Malmö FF)
Viktor Claesson (IF Elfsborg)

Suspended matches

IFK Göteborg vs. Malmö FF
The match at Gamla Ullevi between IFK Göteborg and Malmö FF on 27 April 2016 was abandoned after 77 minutes of play. A firecracker was thrown towards former IFK Göteborg player Tobias Sana from the home section. On 4 May, the Swedish Football Association's disciplinary committee decided that the match would not continue and that the final score would be 0–3.

Jönköpings Södra IF vs. Östersunds FK
The match at Stadsparksvallen between Jönköpings Södra IF and Östersunds FK on 15 August 2016 was abandoned after 90 minutes of play. A spectator invaded the pitch and attacked Östersund's goalkeeper Aly Keita. Keita was advised by team physicians to not finish the game. On 25 August, the Swedish Football Association's disciplinary committee decided that the match would not continue and that the final score would be 0–3. However, the decision was overturned on 27 September and the final score would be 1–1.

Teams

A total of sixteen teams are contesting the league, including fourteen sides from the 2015 season and two promoted teams from the 2015 Superettan. Both of the promoted teams for the 2015 season managed to stay in the league, Hammarby IF and GIF Sundsvall.

Halmstads BK and Åtvidabergs FF were relegated at the end of the 2015 season after finishing in the bottom two places of the table. They were replaced by 2015 Superettan champions Jönköpings Södra IF and runners-up Östersunds FK. Jönköpings Södra IF returned to Allsvenskan after 46 years' absence, having been relegated at the end of the 1969 season. This is Jönköpings Södra's 11th season in the league. Östersunds FK are participating in the league for the first time in the club's history; they are the first new club in Allsvenskan's history since Falkenbergs FF in 2014.

Falkenbergs FF as 14th-placed team retained their Allsvenskan spot after winning against third-placed Superettan team IK Sirius 3–3 (away goals) on aggregate in a relegation/promotion playoff.

Stadia and locations

 1 According to each club information page at the Swedish Football Association website for Allsvenskan.

Personnel and kits

Note: Flags indicate national team as has been defined under FIFA eligibility rules. Players and Managers may hold more than one non-FIFA nationality.

 1 According to each club information page at the Swedish Football Association website for Allsvenskan.

Managerial changes

League table

Positions by round

Results

Play-offs
The 14th-placed team of Allsvenskan meets the third-placed team from 2016 Superettan in a two-legged tie on a home-and-away basis with the team from Allsvenskan finishing at home.

Halmstads BK won 3–2 on aggregate.

Season statistics

Top scorers

Top assists

Top goalkeepers
(Minimum of 10 games played)

Hat-tricks

Note
4 Player scored 4 goals

See also

Competitions
 2016 Superettan
 2016 Division 1
 2015–16 Svenska Cupen
 2016–17 Svenska Cupen

Team seasons
 2016 AIK Fotboll season
 2016 Djurgårdens IF season
 2016 Hammarby Fotboll season
 2016 IFK Göteborg season
 2016 IFK Norrköping season
 2016 Malmö FF season
 2016 Östersunds FK season

Attendances
Teams with an average home attendance of at least 10,000:

References

External links
 

2016
1
Sweden
Sweden